The 2016 African Cross Country Championships was the fourth edition of the international cross country running competition for African athletes organised by the Confederation of African Athletics. It was held on 12 March at the Yaounde Golf Club in Yaoundé, Cameroon – the first time a West African nation had hosted the event since its re-launch in 2011. There were four races on the program: 10 km for senior men, 8 km for senior women, 7 km for junior men and 5.5 km for junior women.

For a fourth successive time, Kenya dominated the event, led by men's winner James Gitahi Rungaru and women's winner Alice Aprot Nawowuna. The country also provided the junior winners (Miriam Cherop and Isaac Kipsang) and topped the team podium in all four races. Only two non-Kenyans won an individual medal: Phillip Kipyeko of Uganda was the men's runner-up and Eritrea's Aron Kifle took third in the men's junior race. Kenya swept the medals on the women's side, including a perfect score of ten in the junior race.

There were 151 racers in all, including 46 men who finished the senior race, 43 men who finished the junior race, 29 women who finished the senior race, and 33 women who finished the junior race. The competition had reduced international participation, with only 16 nations sending athletes – eight fewer than had done so in 2014.

Medallists

Individual

Team

Participation

See also
2016 Asian Cross Country Championships
2016 European Cross Country Championships

References

Results
African Cross-Country Championships, Yaounde (Cameroon) 12/03/2016. Africa Athle. Retrieved on 2016-09-18.

African Cross Country
African Cross Country Championships
Cross Country
African Cross Country
Sport in Yaoundé
21st century in Yaoundé
International athletics competitions hosted by Cameroon
Events in Yaoundé